Lansdowne Avenue station is a SEPTA Media-Sharon Hill Trolley Line stop in Upper Darby, Pennsylvania. It is located at Garrett Road and Lansdowne Avenue, and serves both Routes 101 and 102. The station has one shed with a roofed waiting area on the inbound side and a newer plastic and steel bus type shelter on the outbound side. One of the station's two platforms is located on the corner of Lansdowne Avenue and Winding Way.

Trolleys arriving at this station travel between 69th Street Terminal in Upper Darby, Pennsylvania and either Orange Street in Media, Pennsylvania for the Route 101 line, or Sharon Hill, Pennsylvania for the Route 102 line. It serves as a stop for both local and express lines, and all lines run parallel to Garrett Road. The station is near a local YMCA branch and two Catholic high schools; The Monsignor Bonner High School for boys and the Archbishop Prendergast High School for girls. Both schools merged to form a co-ed campus a few years ago. Lansdowne Avenue's shelters consist of a standard P&W-era stone shed on the southwest corner of the grade crossing, and an open plexiglas bus stop type shelter on the northwest corner of the grade crossing.

Station layout

External links

 Station from Lansdowne Avenue from Google Maps Street View

SEPTA Media–Sharon Hill Line stations